Namorik Airport (or Namdrik Airport) is a public use airstrip located at Namorik on Namorik Atoll, Marshall Islands. This airstrip is assigned the location identifier 3N0 by the FAA and NDK by the IATA.

Facilities 
Namorik Airport is at an elevation of 15 feet (4.6 m) above mean sea level. The runway is designated 07/25 with a coral gravel surface measuring 2,900 by 45 feet (884 x 14 m). There are no aircraft based at Namorik.

Airlines and destinations

References

External links
AirNav airport information for 3N0

Airports in the Marshall Islands